The 1925 Toledo Rockets football team was an American football team that represented Toledo University (renamed the University of Toledo in 1967) during the 1925 college football season. In their third and final season under head coach Pat Dwyer, the team compiled a 1–5 record. The team failed to score in six of nine game and holds the school record for fewest points scored (3.1 points per game).

Richard Kazmier was the team captain.

Schedule

References

Toledo
Toledo Rockets football seasons
Toledo Rockets football